Senator Pilcher may refer to:

J. L. Pilcher (1898–1981), Georgia State Senate
Theodore C. Pilcher (1844–1917), Virginia State Senate

See also
Mary Pilcher-Cook (born 1954), Kansas State Senate